The 2016 TreatMyClot.com 300 by Janessen was the fifth stock car race of the 2016 NASCAR Xfinity Series season and the 18th iteration of the event. The race was held on Saturday, March 19, 2016, in Fontana, California, at Auto Club Speedway, a  permanent D-shaped oval racetrack. The race took the scheduled 150 laps to complete. In a wild finish, Austin Dillon, driving for Richard Childress Racing, would take advantage of both Daniel Suárez, who ran out of fuel on the final lap, and eventual second-place finisher Kyle Busch, who suffered a flat tire on the final lap. The win was Dillon's seventh career NASCAR Xfinity Series win and his first of the season. To fill out the podium, Bubba Wallace, driving for Roush Fenway Racing, would finish third.

Background 

Auto Club Speedway (formerly California Speedway) is a 2 miles (3.2 km), low-banked, D-shaped oval superspeedway in Fontana, California which has hosted NASCAR racing annually since 1997. It is also used for open wheel racing events. The racetrack is located near the former locations of Ontario Motor Speedway and Riverside International Raceway. The track is owned and operated by International Speedway Corporation and is the only track owned by ISC to have naming rights sold. The speedway is served by the nearby Interstate 10 and Interstate 15 freeways as well as a Metrolink station located behind the backstretch.

Entry list 

 (R) denotes rookie driver.
 (i) denotes driver who is ineligible for series driver points.

Practice

First practice 
The first practice session was held on Friday, March 18, at 12:00 PM PST. The session would last for one hour and 25 minutes.

Second and final practice 
The final practice session, sometimes known as Happy Hour, was held on Friday, March 18, at 2:30 PM PST. The session would last for 55 minutes.

Qualifying 
Qualifying was held on Saturday, March 19, at 9:15 AM PST. Since Auto Club Speedway is at least 2 miles (3.2 km) in length, the qualifying system was a single car, single lap, two round system where in the first round, everyone would set a time to determine positions 13–40. Then, the fastest 12 qualifiers would move on to the second round to determine positions 1–12.

Two drivers would fail to qualify: Carl Long and Morgan Shepherd.

Full qualifying results

Race results

Standings after the race 

Drivers' Championship standings

Note: Only the first 12 positions are included for the driver standings.

References 

2016 NASCAR Xfinity Series
NASCAR races at Auto Club Speedway
March 2016 sports events in the United States
2016 in sports in California